This is a list of all NFL players who had outstanding performances throughout the 1920s and have been compiled onto this fantasy group. The team was selected by voters of the Pro Football Hall of Fame retroactively in 1969 to mark the league’s 50th anniversary.

Pro Football Hall of Fame list

References 

National Football League All-Decade Teams
Foot
Foot
Foot
National Football League records and achievements
National Football League lists